Lorenzo Venuti (born 12 April 1995) is an Italian professional footballer who plays as a full-back for Serie A club Fiorentina.

Club career
Born in Montevarchi, Tuscany, Venuti started his career at Tuscan club Fiorentina. On 30 July 2014, he was signed by Serie B club Pescara on a temporary deal, with an option to sign him outright. Venuti was assigned the number 23 shirt for the first team. However, he was only able to play for their reserve team as an overage player. On 27 June 2015, Pescara excised the option to sign Venuti outright, but La Viola also excised the counter-option.

On 16 July 2015, he was signed by Lega Pro newcomers Brescia on a temporary deal, with an option to buy. Brescia was confirmed as the replacement of Parma in the 2015–16 Serie B on 4 August. On 2 August, Venuti made his professional debut against Cremonese, in the 2015–16 Coppa Italia. He was partnered with his former national team teammate Michele Somma in the defensive line-up.

International career
On 5 November 2015, Venuti received his first under-20 team call-up from Alberigo Evani.

Two days after making his professional debut, he received his first under-21 team call-up from Luigi Di Biagio. Venuti made his debut against Hungary coming on in place of Andrea Conti. 

He played twice in the 2014 UEFA European Under-19 Championship qualification round. Venuti and Somma were in the starting line-up in the second match, replacing defenders Filippo Berra and Alessio Romagnoli. Romagnoli returned to the starting line-up in the third match, while Venuti replaced Luca Iotti in the 74th minute.

Personal life 
In May 2020 Venuti tested positive for COVID-19.

References

External links
Profile at the ACF Fiorentina website 
 

Living people
1995 births
Sportspeople from the Province of Arezzo
Footballers from Tuscany
Association football fullbacks
Italy youth international footballers
Italy under-21 international footballers

Italian footballers
ACF Fiorentina players
Delfino Pescara 1936 players
Brescia Calcio players
Benevento Calcio players
U.S. Lecce players
Serie A players
Serie B players